The term Dislocated thumb may refer to:
Ulnar collateral ligament injury of the thumb
An injury to the Abductor pollicis longus muscle